Kakol may refer to:
Kakol, India
Kakol, Iran
Kakol, Khyber Pakhtunkhwa, Pakistan
Kąkol, Kuyavian-Pomeranian Voivodeship, Poland

See also